La Mousmé also known as La Mousmé, Sitting in a Cane Chair, Half-Figure (with a branch of oleander) was painted by Vincent van Gogh in 1888 while living in Arles, which van Gogh dubbed "the Japan of the south".  Retreating from the city, he hoped that his time in Arles would evoke in his work the simple, yet dramatic expression of Japanese art.

Height of Van Gogh's career
At the time that van Gogh painted this portrait he was 35 years old.  Living in Arles in southern France, he was at the height of his career, producing some of his best work. His paintings represented different aspects of ordinary life, such as Harvest at La Crau and this painting, La  Mousmé.  The sunflower paintings, some of the most recognizable of van Gogh's paintings, were created in this time.  He worked continuously to keep up with his ideas for paintings.  This is likely one of van Gogh's happier periods of life.  He is confident, clear-minded and seemingly content.

In a letter to his brother, Theo, he wrote, "Painting as it is now, promises to become more subtle - more like music and less like sculpture - and above all, it promises color." As a means of explanation, van Gogh explains that being like music means being comforting.

A prolific time, in less than 444 days van Gogh made about 100 drawings and produced more than 200 paintings.  Yet, he still found time and energy to write more than 200 letters.  While he painted quickly, mindful of the pace farmers would need to work in the hot sun, he spent time thinking about his paintings long before he put brush to canvas.

The painting
Inspired by Pierre Loti's novel Madame Chrysanthème and Japanese artwork, van Gogh painted La  Mousmé, a well-dressed Japanese girl.  He wrote in a letter to his brother: "It took me a whole week...but I had to reserve my mental energy to do the mousmé well. A mousmé is a Japanese girl—Provençal in this case—twelve to fourteen years old."

Van Gogh's use of color is intended to be symbolic.  The audience is drawn in by his use of contracting patterns and colors that bring in an energy and intensity to the work. Complementary shades of blue and orange, a stylistic deviation from colors of Impressionist paintings that he acquired during his exploration in Paris, stand out against the spring-like pale green in the background.  La Mousmé's outfit is a blend of modern and traditional. Her outfit is certainly modern. The bright colors of skirt and jacket are of the southern region of Arles.  Regarding van Gogh's painting of her features, his greatest attention is focused on the girls face, giving her the coloring of a girl from Arles, but with a Japanese influence.  The young lady's posture mimics that of the oleander.  The flowering oleander, like the girl, is in the blossoming stage of life.

Van Gogh said of portrait studies, such as La Mousmé, "the only thing in painting that excites me to the depths of my soul, and which makes me feel the infinite more than anything else."

The painting is part of the National Gallery of Art collection in Washington, D.C.

Provenance
 Johanna van Gogh-Bonger, the artist's sister-in-law, of Amsterdam had the painting until May 1909. Five paintings that were sold by Johanna became part of the National Gallery of Art collection.
 In May 1909 the painting was sold to J.H. de Bois, an art dealer and director of The Hague branch of the C.M. Van Gogh gallery.  C.M. van Gogh was Vincent's uncle.
 After May 1909 the painting was sold to Carl Sternheim (1878–1942), German playwright and art collector of Munich.  In 1912 he and his wife moved to La Hulpe, Belgium.  By 1933 Sternheim's work was banned by the Nazis.
 By 1917 art collector and dealer Alphonse Kann (1870–1948) of Paris, had the painting.
 J.B. Stang of Oslo had the painting until 1928.
 On 3 January 1928 La Mousmé was sold through Dr. Alfred Gold, an art dealer of Berlin specializing in French paintings, to joint owners Alex Reid and Lefèvre gallery of Glasgow and London and M. Knoedler & Co. of New York, art dealer to some of America's wealthiest individuals.
 The painting was sold 21 May 1929 through Galerie Étienne Bignou, Paris to Chester Dale (1883–1962) of New York.
 In 1963 the painting was bequeathed to the National Gallery of Art and placed in the Dale Chester Collection. Chester Dale, as passionate and successful in his art collection as he was on the Wall Street, bequeathed in 1962 some of America's most important collections of French painting from the late 19th and early 20th centuries to the National Gallery of Art.

La Mousmé drawing
There are several drawings for this painting:
 A portrait sketch, Sitting La Mousmé, is located at the Louvre, Paris, France.
 La Mousmé, Half-Figure in the Collection of Thomas Gibson Fine Art, London, United Kingdom, Europe
 La Mousmé, Sitting located in Pushkin Museum, Moscow, Russia.

References

Paintings by Vincent van Gogh
1888 paintings
Collections of the National Gallery of Art
19th-century portraits
Paintings of Arles by Vincent van Gogh
Portraits of women